Marcella Corcoran Kennedy (born 7 January 1963) is a former Irish Fine Gael politician who served as a Minister of State from 2016 to 2017. She served as a Teachta Dála (TD) from 2011 to 2020.

Corcoran Kennedy was a member of Offaly County Council from 1999 to 2009 for the Ferbane local electoral area. At the 2011 general election, she was elected to the Laois–Offaly constituency, and then at the February 2016, she was elected for the Offaly constituency.

On 19 May 2016, she was appointed as Minister of State at the Department of Health with special responsibility for Health Promotion by the Fine Gael–Independent government on the nomination of Taoiseach Enda Kenny. She was not re-appointed after Leo Varadkar became Taoiseach on 14 June 2017.

She contested the 2020 general election for the reformed constituency of Laois–Offaly, but was not re-elected.

References

1963 births
Living people
Fine Gael TDs
Local councillors in County Offaly
Members of the 31st Dáil
Members of the 32nd Dáil
Ministers of State of the 32nd Dáil
Women ministers of state of the Republic of Ireland
21st-century women Teachtaí Dála